Sattar Sawut (born November 1948) is a former Uyghur politician in Xinjiang.

Sattar was the former director of the Xinjiang Education Department. He was arrested in 2017. Later, he was regarded by the Chinese Communist Party (CCP) as a "two-faced person" who supported the independence movement through editing textbooks. 

Sattar Sawut was sentenced to death for his role in the publication of school textbooks said to incite interethnic hatred. Five other Uyghurs were convicted in the same case. The former head of the local justice department was also sentenced to death for conspiring with Muslim separatists

See also
 Shirzat Bawudun

References

1948 births
Living people
Chinese Muslims
Chinese dissidents
People's Republic of China politicians from Xinjiang
Chinese Communist Party politicians from Xinjiang
Uyghur politicians
Expelled members of the Chinese Communist Party
Xinjiang University alumni
People from Turpan